The following highways are numbered 615:

Costa Rica
 National Route 615

United States